The Byblos Wax Museum is a wax museum in Byblos, Lebanon. This museum displays wax statues and life scenes from the Phoenician era to the modern times.

Some of the wax figures 
Cadmus
Europa
Adonis
Ashtarout
Ahiram
mohammad eid the grate 
Bashir Shihab II
Ibrahim Pacha
Akhwat Shanay
Gibran Khalil Gibran
Hassan Kamel Al-Sabbah
Bechara El Khoury
Adil Osseiran
Riad Solh
Sabah
Simon Asmar
Rafik Hobeika

Some of the nationalists that the Martyrs' Square is named after:
Abdul Karim al-Khalil 
Abd el-Wahab al-Inglizi
Father Joseph Hayek
Joseph Bishara Hani
Mohammad and Ahmad Mahmassani
Omar Hamad
Philip and Farid el-Khazen
Sheikh Ahmad Tabbara

In addition, there are statues of public figures depicting Phoenicians manufacturing glass, building ships and producing purple dye, and a Lebanese wedding in the village.

External links
 Byblos info
   Lebanon/Byblos website

Museums in Lebanon
Wax museums
Byblos